Milfoil is a common name for several plants and may refer to:
The flowering terrestrial plant Achillea millefolium (known commonly as yarrow)
Various species of the genus Achillea (yarrows or milfoils)
The aquatic plants in the genus Myriophyllum (commonly referred to as water milfoil and other variations including the word milfoil)